Stanisław Musiał (1 May 1938, Łososina Górna, Poland – 5 March 2004 Kraków) was a pioneer and leader of Catholic-Jewish dialogue and Polish-Jewish reconciliation.

Biography
He studied philosophy at the Faculty of Philosophy of the Society of Jesus in Kraków and theology at the Bobolanum Theological Faculty in Warsaw, as well as in Rome in Munich. He was ordained as priest in 1963.

A long-time member of the editorial board of Poland's Tygodnik Powszechny, he also directed Kraków's Apostleship of Prayer Publishing House in the years immediately following the Solidarity revolution in Poland. He wrote numerous articles in Gazeta Wyborcza, Midrasz, and Polin on antisemitism, Catholic-Jewish relations, and issues between Poland and world Jewry.

As a member of the Episcopal Commission for Dialog with Judaism from the time of its creation in 1986 until 1997, Fr. Musial played a key role in organizing and facilitating a Geneva meeting among international Catholic and Jewish leaders that led to a 1987 agreement resolving the conflict over the Carmelite Convent at Auschwitz. He was one of the strongest and most forthright voices in the Polish Catholic Church for tolerance and mutual understanding, and was intensely devoted to combating antisemitism and xenophobia.

Active in numerous academic and human rights forums, Fr. Musial was a member of the board of the Geneva-based United Nations Watch and Kraków's Judaica Foundation - Center for Jewish Culture, as well as closely involved with the Auschwitz Jewish Center in Oswiecim.

1938 births
2004 deaths
20th-century Polish Jesuits